The men's +80 kg  competition in taekwondo at the 2000 Summer Olympics in Sydney took place on 30 September at the State Sports Centre.

1997 World champion Kim Kyong-hun captured South Korea's third gold in the sport, as he prevailed over the local favorite Daniel Trenton of Australia 6–2 in the men's heavyweight final despite the ridicule and commotion from a raucous, partisan home crowd. The bronze medal was awarded to France's Pascal Gentil after he knocked out his Saudi Arabian opponent Khaled Al-Dosari in the second round of the repechage final match.

Competition format
The main bracket consisted of a single elimination tournament, culminating in the gold medal match. The taekwondo fighters eliminated in earlier rounds by the two finalists of the main bracket advanced directly to the repechage tournament. These matches determined the bronze medal winner for the event.

Schedule
All times are Greece Standard Time (UTC+2)

Competitors

Results
Legend
PTG — Won by points gap
SUP — Won by superiority
OT — Won on over time (Golden Point)
WO — Walkover

Main bracket

Repechage

References

External links
Official Report

Men's 80 kg
Men's events at the 2000 Summer Olympics